Slumber Party '57 is a 1976 American comedy-drama film directed by William A. Levey and starring Debra Winger in her feature film debut.

Cast
Janet Wood as Smitty
Noelle North as Angie
Bridget Holloman as Bonnie May
Debra Winger as Debbie
Mary Ann Appleseth as Jo Ann
Rainbeaux Smith as Sherry
Rafael Campos as Dope Friend
Will Hutchins as Harold Perkins
Joyce Jillson as Car Hop - Gladys
Joe E. Ross as Patrolman
Bill Thurman as Mr. Willis
Janice Karman as Hank

Reception
Leonard Maltin gave the film one and a half stars.

References

External links
 
 

1976 films
1976 comedy-drama films
American comedy-drama films
Films scored by Miles Goodman
1970s American films
1970s English-language films